Schwingungen is the second album by the Krautrock band Ash Ra Tempel. It was released in 1972 on Ohr. It has been re-released four times, most recently in 2011 on MG Art Records.

The album's first song "Light" is heavily inspired by Peter Green's playing on Fleetwood Mac's "Albatross".

Track listing

Personnel
 Hartmut Enke – guitar, bass, electronics
 Manuel Göttsching – guitar, organ, electronics, choir
 Wolfgang Müller – drums, vibraphone

Additional personnel
 Uli Popp – bongos
 Matthias Wehler – alto saxophone
 John L. – vocals, jaw harp, percussion

Production
 Bernd Bendig – artwork
 Dieter Dierks – engineer
 Jürgen 'Panzer' Dorrmann, Reinhard Kolms – photography
 Rolf-Ulrich Kaiser – producer

References

1972 albums
Ash Ra Tempel albums